The Pacific cod (Gadus macrocephalus) is a species of ray-finned fish in the family Gadidae. It can grow to a length of a meter or so and is found in large schools. It is an important commercial food species and is also known as gray cod or grey cod, and grayfish or greyfish. Fishing for this species is regulated with quotas being allotted for hook and line fishing, pots, and bottom trawls. Fossils have been found in Canada near a Steller Sea lion fossil dating to the Pleistocene.

Description
It has three separate dorsal fins, and the catfish-like whiskers on its lower jaw. In appearance, it is similar to the Atlantic cod. It is found in huge schools.

Molecular genetic analyses strongly suggest that Pacific cod and Greenland cod (Gadus ogac) from Greenland–Arctic Ocean are the same species and that G. ogac should be a junior synonym of G. macrocephalus. Today, ITIS and the Catalogue of Life list Gadus ogac as synonym of G. macrocephalus.

Fisheries

In the Northeast Pacific catches of Pacific cod by the United States trawl fishery and joint-venture fisheries increased from less than 1,000 tonnes in 1979 to nearly 91,000 tonnes in 1984 and reached 430,196 tonnes in 1995. Today, catches are tightly regulated and the Pacific cod quota is split among fisheries that use hook and line gear, pots, and bottom trawls.

Conservation status
The Salish Sea population of Pacific cod is a U.S. National Marine Fisheries Service  Species of Concern, one of those species about which the U.S. government's National Oceanic and Atmospheric Administration has some concerns regarding status and threats, but for which insufficient information is available to indicate a need to list the species under the U.S. Endangered Species Act (ESA).

See also
Cod

Notes

References

External links
 Pacific cod-Gadus macrocephalus fishery profiles Status of Pacific cod fisheries, summarised in FisheriesWiki

Gadus
Commercial fish
Fish of Canada
Fish of China
Fish of Japan
Fish of Russia
Fish of Korea
Fish of the United States
Taxa named by Wilhelm Gottlieb Tilesius von Tilenau
Fish described in 1810